Thomas Newton Leeke (17 January 1854 – 26 October 1933) was an  Anglican priest.  He was the Archdeacon of Totnes from 1921 until his death.

Leeke was educated at Harrow School, Trinity College, Cambridge and Wells Theological College.  His first posts were curacies at Keele and Alcester. He was Rector of Longford from 1880 to 1883,  Vicar of Inkberrow from 1893 to 1896 and Rector of Bideford until 1921, also He was Rural Dean of Hartland from 1914 until his years as Archdeacon.

Notes

1854 births
People educated at Harrow School
Alumni of Trinity College, Cambridge
Archdeacons of Totnes
1933 deaths